Aalborgtårnet (Aalborg Tower) is a 54.9 metre tall observation tower built of lattice steel in Aalborg, Denmark. The tower is built on a hill, providing a total height of 105 metres above sea level. The tower has a restaurant on the top. The tower was completed in 1933, and underwent a major reconstruction from February 2005 to March 2005, in which the whole tower was pulled down and later reerected.

See also
 List of towers

References

External links
 Official site
 

Buildings and structures completed in 1933
Towers in Denmark
Buildings and structures in Aalborg
Tourist attractions in Aalborg